Stéphanie Tesson (born 9 July 1969) is a French actress, director and playwright. She is also a theatrical columnist and co-director of the Poche-Montparnasse theater in Paris.

Life 
She studied at the National School of Theater Arts and Techniques, which she joined after obtaining her master's degree in modern literature with a theater option.

In 2007, she directed Fantasio by Alfred de Musset, at the Ranelagh theatre, with Nicolas Vaude in the role of Fantasio. In 2008, she published in an issue of L'Avant-scène theater the farces comedy "À nous d'œufs," which she staged herself at the Théâtre du Jardin d'Acclimatation. She is also a regular columnist for L'Avant-scène.

Since December 2013, she co-directs the Poche Montparnasse theater, first with the director Charlotte Rondelez. She stages her own productions there, such as that of the play Le Mal court by Jacques Audiberti in 2013, that of L'Amphitryon by Molière in 2017, and that of Les Chaises by Ionesco in 2022.

In addition, every year since 2003, she has created a show-promenade in the Potager du Roi in Versailles as part of Mois Molière.

She also writes for young people: her “country polyphony” Monologues en plein champ, followed by Cœur de lettue published in 2015 in the Collection des quatre vents, or La Loi du nez rouge accompanied by a practical guide in 2018.

Family 
Stéphanie Tesson is the daughter of journalist Philippe Tesson, former CEO of Le Groupe Quotidien, and Marie-Claude Tesson-Millet, former director of Le Quotidien du Médecin1. She is also the sister of travel writer Sylvain Tesson and art journalist Daphné Tesson.

References 

Living people
1969 births
French actors
French directors